Aqa Mirlu (also Romanized as Āqā Mīrlū) is a village in Sanjabad-e Gharbi Rural District, in the Central District of Kowsar County, Ardabil Province, Iran. At the 2006 census, its population was 684, in 114 families.

References 

Tageo

Towns and villages in Kowsar County